The 2003 World Solar Challenge was one of a biennial series of solar-powered car races, covering about  through the Australian Outback, from Darwin, Northern Territory to Adelaide, South Australia.

Ten teams completed the course. The winner was a Nuna car built by Nuon of the Netherlands.

Results

References
 Bridgestone World Solar Challenge: Honour Roll
 ZDP Site

Solar car races
Scientific organisations based in Australia
Science competitions
Photovoltaics
Recurring sporting events established in 1987